The Cross Internacional de San Sebastián, also known as the Cross Internacional de Donostia, is an annual cross country running event which is staged in late January in San Sebastián, Spain.

The competition was first held in 1956 as a men's only race and attracted top level runners from the outset, with Olympic gold medallists Emil Zátopek, Alain Mimoun and Mamo Wolde being among the winners in the first decade of the event. A women's race was introduced in 1971 and two-time World Cross champion Carmen Valero took a record four back-to-back wins soon after. From the 1970s to 1980s, a mix of Iberian and British athletes topped the podium, but since the 1990s the race has been dominated by runners of East African origin.

The grassy course is relatively flat and the distances for the elite races are 10 km for men and 5.3 km for women. In addition to the professional races, there are also popular fun run races on the day's events programme; there are various age category races for children and youths, as well as a veteran's races for older runners.

The Cross de San Sebastián has featured many of the world's most prominent names in long-distance running, including marathon world record holder Haile Gebrselassie, Olympic champions Derartu Tulu, John Ngugi and Rosa Mota, as well as world cross country champions such as Zersenay Tadese, Gebre Gebremariam and Benita Johnson. Among the Europeans to have topped the podium are former world record holders Carlos Lopes and David Bedford, as well as past European Cross champions Marta Domínguez, Paulo Guerra and Serhiy Lebid.  The competition has also incorporated the regional Gipuzkoan cross country championships in previous editions.

Past senior race winners

Victories by nationality

References

List of winners
Cross de San Sebastián. Association of Road Racing Statisticians (2010-02-03). Retrieved on 2011-02-04.

External links
Official Gipuzkoa Athletics Federation website

Cross country running competitions
Athletics competitions in Spain
Recurring sporting events established in 1956
San Sebastián
Cross country running in Spain